Adam Juretzko (born 30 September 1971) is a German wrestler. He competed in the men's Greco-Roman 69 kg at the 2000 Summer Olympics.

References

External links
 

1971 births
Living people
German male sport wrestlers
Olympic wrestlers of Germany
Wrestlers at the 2000 Summer Olympics
People from Tychy
21st-century German people